Brave Hearts Basketball Club, sometimes written as Bravehearts, is a Malawian basketball club based in Lilongwe. The club's colours are green and white. The team played in the qualifiers for the 2022 BAL season.

Players

Current roster 
The following is the Brave Hearts roster for the 2022 BAL Qualifying Tournaments:

References

External links
Facebook page

Basketball teams in Malawi
Road to BAL teams
Lilongwe